Robert Slávik (born May 29, 1974) is a Czech former professional ice hockey goaltender.

Slávik played 65 games in the Czech Extraliga for HC České Budějovice, HC Plzeň and HC Znojemští Orli. He also played two seasons in the German Oberliga for Dresdner Eislöwen and three seasons in the Austrian National League for EV Zeltweg.

Slávik played in the 1994 World Junior Ice Hockey Championships for the Czech Republic.

References

External links

1974 births
Living people
Motor České Budějovice players
Czech ice hockey goaltenders
Dresdner Eislöwen players
HC Karlovy Vary players
Orli Znojmo players
People from Ostrov (Karlovy Vary District)
IHC Písek players
HC Plzeň players
SK Horácká Slavia Třebíč players
HC Tábor players
Sportspeople from the Karlovy Vary Region
Czech expatriate ice hockey players in Germany
Czech expatriate sportspeople in Austria
Expatriate ice hockey players in Austria